Mary Conway may refer to:
 Mary Margaret Conway, American political scientist
 Mary Vincent Conway, Sister of Charity and educator
 Mary Brück, née Conway, Irish astronomer, astrophysicist and historian of science